Cynanchum gracillimum is a species of flowering plant in the family Apocynaceae. Under the synonym Adelostemma gracillimum, it was at one time the only species in the genus Adelostemma. It is native to Myanmar and China (Guangxi, Guizhou, Yunnan).

References

gracillimum
Flora of China
Flora of Myanmar